The Roman Catholic Diocese of Sioux City is the Roman Catholic diocese for the northwestern quarter of the state of Iowa in the United States.  It is a suffragan see of the Archdiocese of Dubuque.  The cathedral parish for this diocese is the Epiphany and the see city is Sioux City. 

The Diocese of Sioux City comprises 24 counties in northwestern Iowa, covering .  Reverend R. Walker Nickless was ordained as bishop of Sioux City on January 20, 2006.

History

1830 to 1920 
The first Catholic missionaries arrived in the Iowa area during the early 1830's. They were under the supervision of the Diocese of St. Louis. In 1837, the Vatican erected the Diocese of Dubuque, covering Iowa and adjoining territories.

In the late 19th century, Bishop John Hennessy of the Diocese of Dubuque requested that the Vatican divide the state into two dioceses, with the new diocese covering the lower half of Iowa. Hennessy suggested that the see of the new diocese be located in Des Moines, Iowa, but the Vatican in 1881 chose Davenport instead.

On July 24, 1900, Pope Leo XIII erected the new Diocese of Sioux City by separating 24 counties in northwestern Iowa from the Archdiocese of Dubuque. The Catholic population of the diocese was about 50,000.The pope appointed Philip Garrigan, vice rector of the Catholic University of American in Washington, D.C., as the first bishop of the new diocese.

Garrigan designated the not yet completed St. Mary's Church, in the center of Sioux City as the Cathedral Church of the Diocese. He renamed the church the Cathedral of the Epiphany. Garrigan carried on an extensive visitation of all the parishes of the diocese. He authored the article on the Diocese of Sioux City for the Catholic Encyclopedia.

1920 to 2000 
Garrigan died in 1919, and Pope Benedict XV named Auxiliary Bishop Edmond Heelan as his successor in 1920. During his term as bishop, Neelan greatly expanded Catholic education in the diocese. In 1929, Heelan donated land in Sioux City to the Sisters of St. Francis for the establishment of Briar Cliff College for women. In 1947, Pope Pius XII named Reverend Joseph Mueller of the Diocese of Belleville as  coadjutor bishop to assist Neelan.  When  Neelan died in 1948, Mueller automatically became bishop of Sioux City. 

During his 22-year-long tenure, Mueller built several new schools, churches, and other parish facilities. After Mueller retired in 1970 Pope Paul VI appointed Auxiliary Bishop Frank Greteman, as the fourth bishop of Sioux City. The primary focus of his episcopate was Catholic education. Greteman retired in 1982. In 1983, Pope John Paul II appointed Reverend Lawrence D. Soens as the next bishop of Sioux City. While Soens was bishop, many programs were established or expanded, including: Ministry 2000, the Priests Retirement Fund, youth ministry programs and the diocese mandated parish pastoral and finance commissions.

In 1997  John Paul II named Reverend Daniel DiNardo from the Diocese of Pittsburgh as coadjutor bishop to assist Soens.  When Soens retired in 1998, DiNardo automatically succeeded him as bishop.

2000 to present 
In 2004, Pope Benedict XVI appointed DiNardo as coadjutor archbishop of the Archdiocese of Galveston-Houston. To replaced DiNardo in Sioux City, Benedict XVI appointed R. Walker Nickless of the Archdiocese of Denver as the seventh bishop of the diocese. Nickless is the current bishop of Sioux City

In 2015, Nickless granted permission to the Ministry Institute of Christ the Servant to identify as a Catholic institute. The Ministry Institute is affiliated with Briar Cliff University.

In 2016, the diocese announced plans to consolidate 41 parishes due a shortage of priests and decreased mass attendance. The parishes being consolidated would become oratories for prayer services, funerals, and weddings but no weekly masses. Most of the affected parishes were in rural areas.

Sex abuse 
On June 8, 2005, Bishop Soens and the diocese were sued by a man who accused Soens of fondling him, starting in 1963 when Soens was director at Regina Catholic High School in Iowa City. On November 6, 2008, the diocesan review board for the Diocese of Sioux City reported that there were credible accusations that Soens had sexually abused minors.  Thirty-one men had accused him of abusing them between 1950 and 1983.  His case was referred to the Vatican for further action.

On October 31, 2018, the diocese admitted that for several decades it had concealed sexual abuse committed by Coyle. Coyle abused at least 50 boys during his time as priest. Coyle confessed his criminal history to Soens in 1986, who placed him on a six-month medical leave, but did not report the admission to police or defrock him. The diocese eventually forbid Coyle from publicly functioning as a priest.  However, he still remained a priest and continued to collect financial assistance from the diocese while living in Albuquerque, New Mexico. The diocese did not notify anyone of his admission nor of allegations against Coyle, and it did not take any further action against him.

Bishops

Bishops of Sioux City
 Philip Joseph Garrigan (1902–1919)
 Edmond Heelan (1920–1948)  - Thomas Lawrence Noa (Coadjutor 1946–1947), appointed Bishop of Marquette before succession
 Joseph Maximilian Mueller (1948–1970; Coadjutor 1947-1948)
 Frank Henry Greteman (1970–1983)
 Lawrence Donald Soens (1983–1998)
 Daniel N. DiNardo (1998–2004), appointed Coadjutor Bishop and later Coadjutor Archbishop and Archbishop of Galveston-Houston (elevated to Cardinal in 2007)
 R. Walker Nickless (2005–present)

Auxiliary bishops
 Edmond Heelan (1918–1920), appointed Bishop of Sioux City
 Frank Henry Greteman (1965–1970), appointed Bishop of Sioux City

Other diocesan priests who became bishops
 Dennis Marion Schnurr, appointed Bishop of Duluth in 2001 and later Archbishop of Cincinnati

High schools

Closed schools

References

External links

 
 The Ministry Institute of Christ the Servant 

 
Roman Catholic dioceses in the United States
Roman Catholic
Roman Catholic
Roman Catholic dioceses and prelatures established in the 20th century
1902 establishments in Iowa